The men's 200 metre individual medley (IM) at the 2007 World Aquatics Championships took place on 28 March (heats and semifinals) and on the evening of 29 March (final) at Rod Laver Arena in Melbourne, Australia. 79 swimmers were entered in the event, of which 74 swam.

Existing records at the start of the event were:
World record (WR): 1:55.84, Michael Phelps (USA), 20 August 2006 in Victoria, Canada.
Championship record (CR): 1:56.04, Michael Phelps (USA), Barcelona 2003 (25 July 2003)

Results

Finals

Semifinals

Heats

See also
Swimming at the 2005 World Aquatics Championships – Men's 200 metre individual medley
Swimming at the 2008 Summer Olympics – Men's 200 metre individual medley
Swimming at the 2009 World Aquatics Championships – Men's 200 metre individual medley

References

Men's 200m IM Heats results from the 2007 World Championships. Published by OmegaTiming.com (official timer of the 2007 Worlds); retrieved 10 April 2018.
Men's 200m IM Semifinals results from the 2007 World Championships. Published by OmegaTiming.com (official timer of the 2007 Worlds); retrieved 10 April 2018.
Men's 200m IM Final results from the 2007 World Championships. Published by OmegaTiming.com (official timer of the 2007 Worlds); retrieved 10 April 2018.

Swimming at the 2007 World Aquatics Championships